In Finnish folklore, Ajatar, also spelled Ajattara , Aiätär , or Aijotar , is an evil female spirit.

Description
In Finnish folklore Ajatar is an evil female spirit. She lives in the woods located at the mountains of Pohjola; she is described as having "hair-plait reached to her heels and whose breasts hung down to her knees" similar to the Swedish Skogsnufva, Danish 'seawoman', or the wildfraulein of the eifel.

Ajatar is the granddaughter of Hiisi (the master of the woods and spreader of disease) and is the master of Lempo and Gnomes. Through her connections with Hiisi and Lempo, she is said to spread disease and pestilence.

She is closely associated with serpents, and is often depicted in modern art as a dragon or half-humanoid and serpentine figure.

Etymology 
The word “ajatar” is possibly derived from the Finnish word ajattaa, “to pursue" (also, "to drive"). The feminine suffix “-tar-” appears in several Finnish names, including a variation of Louhi (Louhetar, Loviatar, Louhiatar) and Syöjätär (syödä ‘to eat,’ with the feminine suffix of -tar, means ‘devourer, vampire’). Applying this to Ajatar, the verb ajaa is suffixed by the feminine "-tar," translating as “female pursuer.” The name may have its root in aika 'time' as well, from where ajatar would be an equally regular derivative. Or both. Aika and ajaa might be etymologically connected through the sense of time, like death, hunting oneself.

In other media

Derivative works
Although Ajatar does not appear by name in documented Finnish folk songs, she appears in fiction inspired by the Kalevala and in modern fantasy interpretations.
In the second act of Aleksis Kivi’s play, Kullervo (1860), Ajatar is described as ferocious and shameless, encouraging the protagonist to kill his master’s family. Ajatar states that she lives in the mountains, has Lempo and Gnomes in her service, and that her mother’s father is Hiisi. Ajatar is further described as “nasty” and compared to a “vicious wife who rejoices in evils.”
In The Eye of Disparager: Book One of the Legend of the Bloodstone written by Brett Stuart Smith, Ajatar is a beautiful woman with the upper body of a green scaled woman and the lower half made up of many snakes. She has serpentine fangs and seductive eyes, and is the mother of all snakes.
Ajatar is mentioned twice in Matt Smith’s Big Game: Movie Tie-in Edition. Smith referred to her as “the Devil of the Woods who appeared as a dragon and made you sick if you so much as looked at her” and later associations a force of nature to her destructive powers.
Fantasy author, Philip Mazza, portrays the Ajatar as a race of fire breathing dragons, causing pestilence and disease. In his book, The Harrow: From Under a Tree, Mazza describes two races of Ajatar, black and red, which fight amongst each other. One race, the black dragons, are evil whereas the red race are described as more benevolent.
In the novel Beneath The Mantle by Ahimsa Kerp, Ajatar is a secondary antagonist serving Ra, the Sun God.
The second book, Midnight Oil, of the Compleat and True History of the Witches of Galdorheim series by Marva Dasef describes a confrontation between the evil forest elemental, Ajatar, and her air spirit sister, Ilmatar. Ajatar takes dragon form and Ilmatar that of a white roc in a battle in the skies to settle the dispute between the sisters--over a man, of course.

Christian references
In some Finnish translations of The Bible the term ajatar is used to refer to certain demons or devils :
In Leviticus [17.7] of the Finnish Bible (1776 ed., see also Bible translations into Finnish), a variation of Ajatar’s name (Ajattaroille = to the Ajattaras/Ajatars) appears to use her as a general devil or demon and not a separate entity. 
"Ja ei millään muotoa enää uhriansa uhraaman ajattaroille, joiden kanssa he huorin tehneet ovat. Se pitää oleman heille heidän sukukunnissansa ijankaikkinen sääty,"

Music
Ajatar by Winter Gardens (2011).
Ajatar Rising by Epic North Music (2013).
Ajattara, a Finnish Black Metal named after Ajatar.

See also
 Äijo, Louhi, and Loviatar, and Syöjätär - Finnish folklore figures with some similar characteristics.

References

Sources

 

Finnish folklore
Female legendary creatures